= Asafia school =

Coordinates: 17.37641°N 78.49492°E

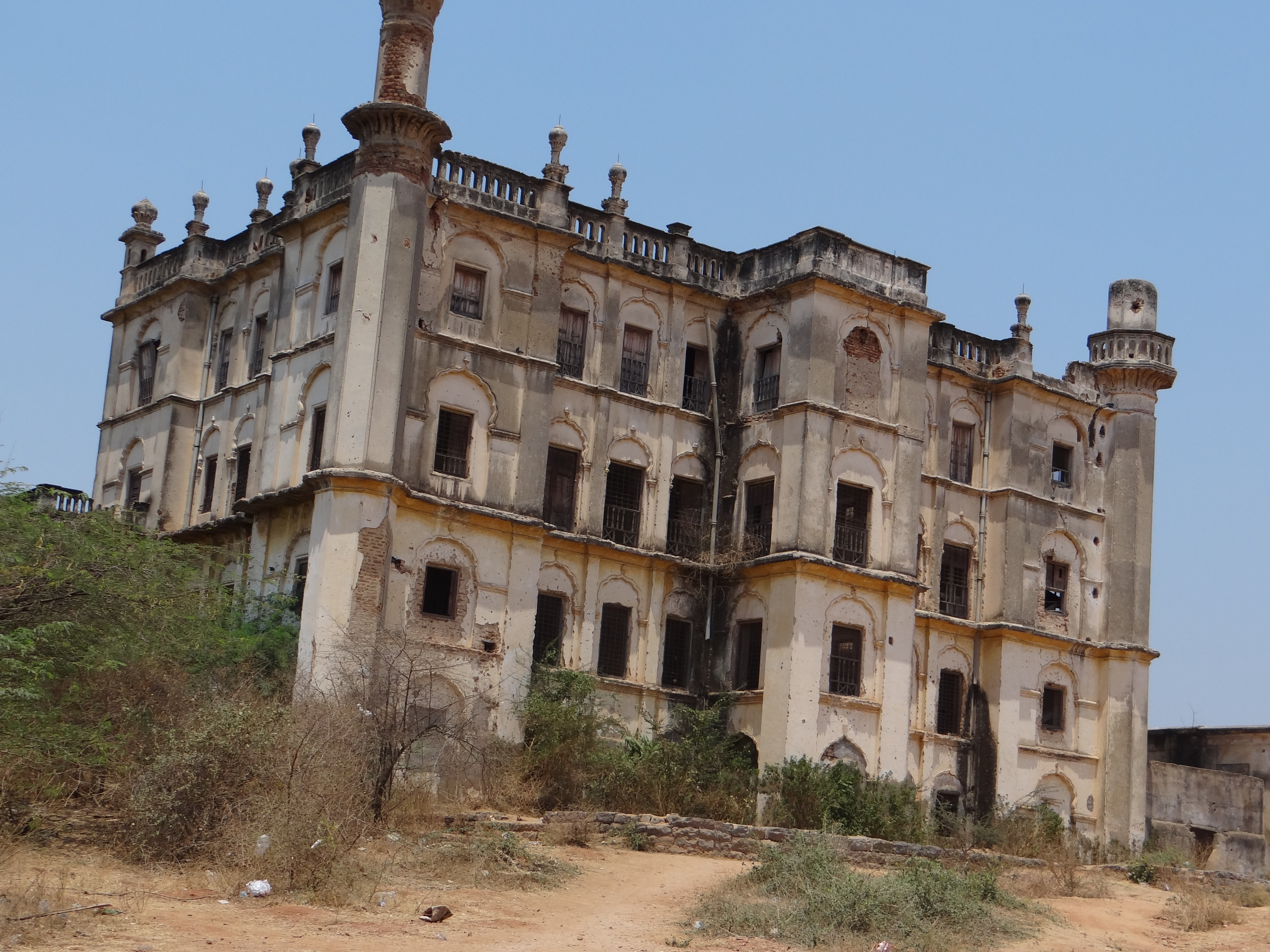
Abandoned building of Asafiya High School in dilapidated state

Asafia school, located near Malakpet in Hyderabad, was built in 1895 by Afsar ud Dowla, during the Nizam regime. A well-known architect of the Nizam period, Abdul Karim Babu Khan, worked on this building. The school was inaugurated by Kishan Parsad, Deputy Minister of Hyderabad state. The building was abandoned in 1963 and the school shifted to a new location.

== Description ==
It is a four storied building.

=== Mosque ===
The Mahbubia mosque was situated on the third floor.
